The Thief of Tibidabo is a 1964 Spanish-French crime-comedy film directed by Maurice Ronet and starring Anna Karina.

Cast
 Luis Ciges
 Enrique Herreros
 Anna Karina
 José Nieto
 Jesús Puche
 Maurice Ronet
 Amparo Soler Leal
 Salvador Soler Marí

References

External links

1964 films
Spanish crime comedy films
1960s Spanish-language films
French crime comedy films
French black-and-white films
Films directed by Maurice Ronet
1960s French films
1960s Spanish films